The Flannery O'Connor Award for Short Fiction is an annual prize awarded by the University of Georgia Press named in honor of the American short story writer and novelist Flannery O'Connor.

Established in 1983 to encourage young writers by bringing their work to the attention of readers and reviewers, it has since become a significant proving ground for newcomers.

It is awarded annually to two winners for a collection of short stories or novellas. Authors of winning manuscripts receive a cash award of $1,000, and their collections are subsequently published under a standard contract. The Press occasionally selects more than two winners.

Starting in 2016, there was only one winner per competition cycle.

Winners
 1983 David Walton for Evening Out
 1983 Leigh Allison Wilson for From the Bottom Up
 1984 Mary Hood for How Far She Went
 1984 Sandra Thompson for Close-Ups
 1984 Susan Neville for The Invention of Flight
 1985 Daniel Curley Living with Snakes
 1985 François Camoin for Why Men are Afraid of Women
 1985 Molly Giles for Rough Translations
 1986 Peter Meinke for The Piano Tuner
 1986 Tony Ardizzone for The Evening News
 1987 Melissa Pritchard for Spirit Seizures
 1987 Salvatore La Puma for The Boys of Bensonhurst
 1988 Gail Galloway Adams for The Purchase of Order
 1988 Philip F. Deaver for Silent Retreats
 1989 Carol L. Glickfeld for Useful Gifts
 1990 Antonya Nelson for The Expendables
 1990 Debra Monroe for The Source of Trouble
 1990 Nancy Zafris for The People I Know
 1991 Robert H. Abel for Ghost Traps
 1991 T. M. McNally for Low flying Aircraft
 1992 Alfred DePew for The Melancholy of Departure
 1992 Dennis Hathaway for The Consequences of Desire
 1993 Alyce Miller for The Nature of Longing
 1993 Dianne Nelson for A Brief History of Male Nudes in America
 1995 C. M. Mayo for Sky Over El Nido
 1996 Ha Jin for Under the Red Flag
 1996 Paul Rawlins for No Lie Like Love
 1996 Wendy Brenner for Large Animals in Everyday Life
 1998 Frank Soos for Unified Field Theory
 1999 Hester Kaplan for The Edge of Marriage
 1999 Mary Clyde for Survival Rates
 2000 Robert Anderson for Ice Age
 2000 Darrell Spencer for Caution: Men in Trees
 2001 Bill Roorbach for Big Bend
 2001 Dana Johnson for Break Any Woman Down
 2002 Kellie Wells for Compression Scars
 2002 Rita Ciresi for Mother Rocket
 2003 Catherine Brady for Curled in the Bed of Love
 2003 Ed Allen for Ate It Anyway
 2004 No award (award to Brad Vice rescinded due to a plagiarism scandal)
 2005 David Crouse for Copy Cats
 2006 Greg Downs for Spit Baths
 2007 Anne Panning for Super America
 2007 Margot Singer for The Pale of Settlement
 2007 Peter LaSalle for Tell Borges If You See Him
 2008 Andrew J. Porter for The Theory of Light and Matter
 2008 Peter Selgin for Drowning Lessons
 2009 Geoffrey Becker for Black Elvis
 2009 Lori Ostlund The Bigness of the World
 2010 Jessica Treadway for Please Come Back to Me
 2010 Linda L. Grover for The Dance Boots
 2011 Amina Gautier for At-Risk
 2011 Melinda Moustakis for Bear Down, Bear North: Alaska Stories
 2012 E.J. Levy for Love, In Theory
 2012 Hugh Sheehy for The Invisibles
 2013 Jacqueline Gorman for The Viewing Room
 2013 Tom Kealey for Thieves I've Known
 2014 Karin Lin-Greenberg for Faulty Predictions
 2014 Monica McFawn for Bright Shards of Someplace Else
 2014 Toni Graham for The Suicide Club
 2015 Anne Raeff for The Jungle Around Us
 2015 Lisa Graley for The Current that Carries
 2016 Becky Mandelbaum for Bad Kansas
 2017 Kirsten Sundberg Lunstrum for What We Do With the Wreckage
 2018 Colette Sartor for Once Removed
 2019 Patrick Earl Ryan for If We Were Electric
 2020 Kate McIntyre for Mad Prairie
 2021 Toni Ann Johnson for Light Skin Gone to Waste

Finalists 
 2009 Scott Elliott for Arrangements

See also

 List of American literary awards

References

External links
 

University of Georgia
Awards established in 1983
Short story awards
Novella awards
American fiction awards